Frederik Adolph de Roepstorff (25 March 1842 – 24 October 1883) was a Danish philologist who worked in the Andaman penal colony in India, in charge of the Nicobar Islands, where he was shot dead by a convict. He studied the languages of Andaman and Nicobar tribes and collected numerous specimens of fauna and flora. The Andaman masked owl (Tyto deroepstorffi) was named after him by Hume.

Biography 
De Roepstorff was born aboard an English ship sailing from Madras to Europe near the Cape of Good Hope and baptized in Cape Town giving him English citizenship. He was the son of Captain Adolph de Roepstorff and Charlotte Georgiana Holmes, born Farley. He studied in  Copenhagen and at Horsens Statsskole graduating in 1863. He went to India in 1867 and became an extra assistant superintendent in the Andaman Islands penal colony and later became in-charge of the Nicobar Islands. His work was to supervise the prisoners. He went back to Denmark in 1871, married Hedevig Christiane Willemoës (30 November 1843 – 21 August 1896, Copenhagen) on 11 January 1872 and made a trip again in 1878. His wife was a missionary and continued her work in the Nicobars. The penal settlement largely consisted of Indian sepoys from the 1857 rebellion. 

The death of Roepstorff has two versions. In one a small group of Indian soldiers had been posted to Kamorta where one was reported to steal coconuts from the natives. He was reprimanded by Roepstorff with the threat of being sent off to Port Blair. The next morning, as de Roepstorff was mounting his horse, the soldier shot him and injured him grievously. He sent of a letter to the Andamans but died before help could arrive. He was nursed by the Nicobarese who refused to let Indians near him and buried him after he died. The other version, of greater veracity, is that a havildar from the Madras army stationed at Nankauri was on trial for assaulting a convict. The case had been adjourned by de Roepstorff and, afraid of being dismissed from the army, he had taken a shot at de Roepstorff who was riding by and when he found that he had mortally wounded him, he shot himself. It took five days for the news to reach, and for officials to arrive, leaving Mrs de Roepstorff to deal with the situation on her own. His grave was described as being in ‘the  little  Camorta  graveyard, where  the  bluff  near the English settlement overlooks the beautiful Nancowry harbour, and the nestling huts of the natives whom he loved so well’. The grave of Nicolas Shimmings was next to his.

De Roepstorff was a member of several scholarly societies including the Asiatic Society of Bengal to whose journal he contributed notes. In his spare time he took a great interest in the fauna and flora, collecting specimens for the Indian Museum, as well as sending them to specialists in Europe. He also explored the region and wrote to various journals of ethnology and geographical exploration. With geologist Ferdinand Stoliczka, he explored a kitchen midden in the Andamans that they dated to the Neolithic period.  He also helped set up the Nicobar Islands Eclipse station to observe the total solar eclipse of 6 April 1875. The scientific team included Captain J. Waterhouse, Professor A. Pedler and Pietro Tacchini. As an ethnologist, he also recorded stories and beliefs. In one publication, he notes that the Nicobarese had a rule that the name of a dead person should never be mentioned. This essentially meant that they could not have an oral history. De Roepstorff and his wife were both interested in linguistics, philology, and ethnography and they compiled a dictionary of the Nancowry dialect. They also edited a translation of the Gospel of  Matthew into Nicobarese which had been begun by Moravian missionaries and this was published after his death by his wife in 1884. His work on linguistics was continued by his successor Edward Horace Man. He also collected specimens of birds from the Islands and corresponded with A.O. Hume who named it Strix De-Roepstorffi (now Tyto deroepstorffi) after him in 1875. He contributed insects, molluscs, and snake specimens to the Indian Museum. Several insects described from his collections bear his name - including Eurema blanda roepstorffi, Euploea midamus roepstorffi, Prosopeas roepstorffi, Hebomoia glaucippe roepstorffi and Diceros roepstorffi . He sent molluscs to the Indian Museum among which he named one species as Ennea (Huttonella) moerchiana after his Danish collaborator Otto Andreas Lowson Mörch in a manuscript, a name that was retained in the formal description by Geoffrey Nevill. His collections of molluscs were made available to H.H. Godwin-Austen by Christiane after her husband's death.

References

External links 
 Vocabulary of dialects spoken in the Nicobar and Andaman Isles : with a short account of the natives, their customs and habits, and of previous attempts at colonisation (1875)
 A dictionary of the Nancowry dialect of the Nicobarese language (1884)

Danish ethnologists
1842 births
1883 deaths
Danish naturalists